Howcroft is a surname. Notable people with the surname include:

Albert Howcroft (1882–1955), English cricketer
Russel Howcroft, Australian businessman

See also
Hopcroft